Istočna Ilidža (lit. "East Ilidža") is a municipality in the city of Istočno Sarajevo located in Republika Srpska, an entity of Bosnia and Herzegovina. As of 2013, it has a population of 14,763 inhabitants.

It was also known as Srpska Ilidža (Српска Илиџа, "Serbian Ilidža"), as well as Kasindo, and was created from part of the pre-war municipality of Ilidža (the other part of the pre-war municipality is now in the Federation of Bosnia and Herzegovina). There have been some proposals for the municipality to be merged with that of Istočno Novo Sarajevo.

Demographics

Population

Ethnic composition

Sport
The local football club is FK Famos, which competes in the First League of the Republika Srpska.

Gallery

References

External links 

 Official website

Populated places in Istočna Ilidža
Municipalities of Republika Srpska
Istočno Sarajevo